The 1971 Scheldeprijs was the 58th edition of the Scheldeprijs cycle race and was held on 27 July 1971. The race was won by Gustaaf Van Roosbroeck.

General classification

References

1971
1971 in road cycling
1971 in Belgian sport